The Dedham Community House is a house on the banks of the Charles River in Dedham, Massachusetts owned and operated by the Dedham Community Association.

Haven house
It was originally built in 1798 for Judge Samuel Haven and designed by Charles Bulfinch. The land was once owned by Haven's father, Jason Haven, and maternal grandfather, Samuel Dexter. It was noted as one of the most hospitable houses of the day in Massachusetts. The Havens entertained many distinguished guests, including Richard Henry Dana Sr., Elizabeth Peabody, Nathaniel Hawthorne and his wife, Horace Mann and his wife, Oliver Wendell Holmes Sr., Oliver Wendell Holmes Jr., Washington Allston and his wife, Charles Folsom and his wife, Judge Theron Metcalf and his wife, and Abraham Lincoln. The house is mentioned in The Life of Nathaniel Hawthorne by Julian Hawthorne.

The rooms on the first floor feature high ceilings, long French windows, tiled fireplaces, carved mahogany mantles and moldings, and original chandeliers. A curved staircase leads to a second floor with smaller chamber rooms.

After the Havens, the house was owned by Freeman Fisher.

Community House

In 1922 it was purchased by Charles J. Kimball and a group of civic-minded citizens for use as a community center.   Today the Community House is dedicated to  "advancing the educational, recreational, cultural and civic interests of residents of all ages of Dedham and surrounding communities."  They offer a pre-school, summer camp, and a variety of classes and workshops throughout the year for all ages.  In 1924, the House hosted six weeks of supervised play for children during the summer months. The program was expanded and moved to the various neighborhoods of town the following summer.

In 2017, a grant from the Foundation for MetroWest paid to refurbish the 27 windows of the building.  As part of that project, old cupboards and cabinets were discovered after having previously been painted shut. The house was shown in the 2014 film The Judge.

Notes

References

Works cited

Charles Bulfinch buildings
Buildings and structures in Dedham, Massachusetts
Houses in Norfolk County, Massachusetts
Houses completed in 1798